Italy was the host nation for the 2006 Winter Olympics in Turin. It was the second time that Italy had hosted the Winter Games (after the 1956 Winter Olympics in Cortina d'Ampezzo) and the third time overall (after the 1960 Summer Olympics in Rome). Italy's flag bearer for the opening ceremony was figure skater Carolina Kostner. Kostner's cousin, Isolde Kostner, was Italy's flag bearer at the 2002 Winter Olympics.

Medalists

Host 
Italy were hosting the Winter Olympics for the second time. The 1956 Winter Olympics were held in Cortina d'Ampezzo. Cortina d'Ampezzo had also been awarded the 1944 Winter Olympics which were cancelled due to World War II.

Alpine skiing 

Men

Women

Note: In the men's combined, run 1 is the downhill, and runs 2 and 3 are the slalom. In the women's combined, run 1 and 2 are the slalom, and run 3 the downhill.

Biathlon 

Men

Women

Bobsleigh

Cross-country skiing 

Distance

Men

Women

Sprint

Curling

Men's tournament

Team: Joël Retornaz (skip), Fabio Alvera, Gian Paolo Zandegiacomo
, Antonio Menardi, Marco Mariani (alternate)

Round robin
Draw 1
;Draw 2
;Draw 3
;Draw 5
;Draw 7
;Draw 8
;Draw 9
;Draw 10
;Draw 12

Standings

Women's tournament

Team: Diana Gaspari (skip), Giulia Lacedelli, Rosa Pompanin, Violetta Caldart, Eleonora Alvera (alternate)

Round robin
Draw 1
;Draw 3
;Draw 4
;Draw 5
;Draw 7
;Draw 8
;Draw 9
;Draw 10
;Draw 11

Standings

Key: The hammer indicates which team had the last stone in the first end.

Figure skating 

Key: CD = Compulsory Dance, FD = Free Dance, FS = Free Skate, OD = Original Dance, SP = Short Program

Freestyle skiing

Ice hockey

Men's tournament

Players

Round-robin

Women's tournament

Players

Round-robin

Classification games

5th-8th classification

7th place game

Luge

Nordic combined 

Davide Bresadola took part in both Nordic combined and ski jumping.

Note: 'Deficit' refers to the amount of time behind the leader a competitor began the cross-country portion of the event. Italicized numbers show the final deficit from the winner's finishing time.

Short track speed skating 

Key: 'ADV' indicates a skater was advanced due to being interfered with.

Skeleton

Ski jumping 

Davide Bresadola took part in both Nordic combined and ski jumping.

Note: PQ indicates a skier was pre-qualified for the final, based on entry rankings.

Snowboarding 

Halfpipe

Note: In the final, the single best score from two runs is used to determine the ranking. A bracketed score indicates a run that wasn't counted.

Parallel GS

Key: '+ Time' represents a deficit; the brackets indicate the results of each run.

Snowboard Cross

Speed skating 

Team Pursuit

Athlete's oath 
Italian skier Giorgio Rocca delivered the Olympic Oath at the opening ceremonies of the Olympics.

References

External links
 

Nations at the 2006 Winter Olympics
2006
Winter Olympics